Field may refer to:

Expanses of open ground
 Field (agriculture), an area of land used for agricultural purposes
 Airfield, an aerodrome that lacks the infrastructure of an airport
 Battlefield
 Lawn, an area of mowed grass
 Meadow, a grassland that is either natural or allowed to grow unmowed and ungrazed
 Playing field, used for sports or games

Arts and media
 In decorative art, the main area of a decorated zone, often contained within a border, often the background for motifs
 Field (heraldry), the background of a shield
 In flag terminology, the background of a flag
 FIELD (magazine), a literary magazine published by Oberlin College in Oberlin, Ohio
 Field (sculpture), by Anthony Gormley

Organizations
 Field department, the division of a political campaign tasked with organizing local volunteers and directly contacting voters
 Field Enterprises, a defunct private holding company
 Field Communications, a division of Field Enterprises
 Field Museum of Natural History, in Chicago

People
 Field (surname)
 Field Cate (born 1997), American child actor

Places
 Field, British Columbia, Canada
 Field, Kentucky, United States
 Field, Minneapolis, Minnesota, United States
 Field, Ontario, Canada
 Field, Staffordshire, England, United Kingdom
 Field, South Australia
 Field Hill, British Columbia, Canada
 Field Island, Nunavut, Canada
 Mount Field (disambiguation), mountains in Canada, the United States, Australia and Antarctica

Science, technology, and mathematics

Computing
 Field (computer science), a smaller piece of data from a larger collection (e.g., database fields)
 Field-programmability, an electronic device's capability of being reprogrammed with new logic

Geology
 Field (mineral deposit), a mineral deposit containing valuable resources in a cost-competitive concentration
 Polje or karst field, a characteristic landform in karst topography

Mathematics
 Field (mathematics), type of algebraic structure
 Number field, specific type of the above algebraic structure
 Scalar field, assignment of a scalar to each point in a mathematical space
 Tensor field, assignment of a tensor to each point in a mathematical space
 Vector field, assignment of a vector to each point in a mathematical space
 Field of sets, a mathematical structure of sets in an abstract space
 Field of a binary relation, union of its domain and its range

Optics
 Field of view, the area of a view imaged by a lens
 Visual field, the part of the field of view which can be perceived by the eye's retina
 Depth of field,  the distance from before to beyond the subject that appears to be in focus (and likewise, field, in the context of depth, is the portion of a scene for which objects within its range are or would be in focus)

Physics
 Field (physics), a mathematical construct for analysis of remote effects
 Electric field, term in physics to describe the energy that surrounds electrically charged particles
 Magnetic field, force produced by moving electric charges
 Electromagnetic field, combination of an electric field and magnetic field
 Gravitational field, a representation of the combined effects of remote masses on a test particle at each point

Sociology
 Field (Bourdieu), a sociological term coined by Pierre Bourdieu to describe the system of objective relations constituted by various species of capital
 Sexual field, the systems of objective relations within collective sexual life

Other uses in science and technology
 Field (geography), a spatially dependent variable
 Field (video), one half of a frame in an interlaced display
 Field coil, of an electric motor or generator
 Field experiment
 Field magnet, a magnet used to produce a magnetic field
 Field research or fieldwork, the collection of information outside a laboratory, library or workplace setting
 Field of heliostats, an assembly of heliostats acting together

Sports
 Pitch (sports field)

Other uses
 Field of study, a subdivision of an academic discipline
 Field of use, permissible operation by the licensee of a patent
 Track and field, a group of sports

See also
 The Field (disambiguation)
 Fields (disambiguation)
 The Fields (disambiguation)
 Fielding (disambiguation)
 Feeld, a location-based social discovery service application for iOS and Android
 Feild, surname